Bernard Sydney "Joey" Sadler (28 July 1914 – 24 June 2007) was a New Zealand rugby union player who played at halfback for the All Blacks in 1935–36.

Career

Sadler was born in Wellington, New Zealand in 1914. He first attracted attention playing in the Wellington College 1st XV between 1930 and 1932. Sadler played club rugby for Wellington College Old Boys and made the  representative side in 1934.

He was picked for the All Blacks' 1935–36 squad, playing 15 games including three internationals on tour in the British Isles and Canada. He played in both tests in the Bledisloe Cup against the touring Australian side in 1936.

Unfortunately, he damaged a nerve in his knee in a club game early in the 1937 season to such an extent that he never played rugby again. Sadler was a small player known by the British press as "the pocket battleship" for his strength. He was also a skilled ball player with good leg speed.

Sadler married Noeleen Welborne Nelson at St Mark's Church, Wellington, on 5 February 1941. They lived for much of their lives in Paraparaumu Beach.

References

1914 births
2007 deaths
New Zealand international rugby union players
People educated at Wellington College (New Zealand)
New Zealand rugby union players
Rugby union players from Wellington City
People from Paraparaumu
Wellington rugby union players
Rugby union scrum-halves